Albert Austin (1881–1953) was a British-American actor.

Albert Austin may also refer to:

Albert E. Austin (1877–1942), American politician
Albert Pompey Austin (1846–1889), Australian footballer
Albert William Austin (1857–1934), Canadian businessman and golfer